James Edward O'Conor CIE (1843 – 8 January 1917) was a British colonial administrator.

He joined the Indian Civil Service around 1870, and in 1873 was made Registrar of the Department of Revenue, Agriculture and Commerce; he was later appointed the Assistant Secretary in charge of the statistical branch. In 1908, he worked with the Fowler Currency Commission.

References
Obituary: pp. 152–3, The Annual Register: a review of public events at home and abroad, for the year 1917. London: Longmans, Green and Co. 1918.

1917 deaths
Indian Civil Service (British India) officers
Year of birth unknown
Companions of the Order of the Indian Empire
1843 births